Macrosoma leucophasiata is a moth-like butterfly in the family Hedylidae. It was described by Paul Thierry-Mieg in 1904.

References

Hedylidae
Butterflies described in 1904